The Colorado Avalanche are a professional ice hockey team based in Denver, Colorado, United States.  They are members of the Central Division of the Western Conference of the National Hockey League (NHL).  The Avalanche arrived in Denver in 1995 after playing since 1972 as the Quebec Nordiques.   Since their arrival, over 190 players have played at least one NHL game for the Avalanche.  Forty-one of those players have won a Stanley Cup championship with the Avalanche.  Six of those players—Adam Foote, Peter Forsberg, Jon Klemm, Patrick Roy, Joe Sakic and Stephane Yelle—were members of both Cup-winning teams in 1996 and 2001.  Joe Sakic is the franchise leader in goals, assists and points.

Six former players have had their number retired by the Avalanche.   Ray Bourque's #77 was retired November 24, 2001, Patrick Roy's #33 was retired October 28, 2003, long-time captain Joe Sakic's #19 was retired October 1, 2009, Peter Forsberg's #21 was retired October 8, 2011, Adam Foote's #52 was retired November 2, 2013, and Milan Hejduk's #23 was retired January 6, 2018.  Six players have been inducted into the Hockey Hall of Fame:  Jari Kurri, Rob Blake ,Ray Bourque, Joe Sakic, Peter Forsberg, and Patrick Roy.  Kurri and Bourque played only the final season of their careers in Colorado, while Roy arrived in the team's first season in Denver, remaining with the Avalanche until his retirement in 2003 as the NHL's all-time wins leader.

Key
 Appeared in an Avalanche game during the 2021–22 NHL season and/or is still part of the organization.
 Stanley Cup winner, retired jersey or elected to the Hockey Hall of Fame

This list does not include data from the Quebec Nordiques. The seasons column lists the first year of the season of the player's first game and the last year of the season of the player's last game. For example, a player who played one game in the 2000–01 season would be listed as playing with the team from 2000–01, regardless of what calendar year the game occurred within.

Statistics are complete to the end of the 2021–22 NHL season.

Goaltenders

Skaters

References

Footnotes

 
players
Colorado Avalanche